Nicolás Dueñas Navarro (18 June 1941 - 2 November 2019) was a Spanish actor. He shot to fame with the theatre play 'Toc Toc'. Later, he became a regular actor in Spanish films and appeared in films like El crimen de Cuenca' (1980), 'Gary Cooper, que estás en los cielos...' (1981), 'Divinas palabras' (1987) and 'Tu nombre envenena mis sueños' (1996). He also acted in a Television series named 'Aquí no hay quien viva'.

He was the father of Goya Award-winning actress Lola Dueñas.

References

1941 births
2019 deaths
Male actors from Madrid
Spanish male film actors
Spanish male television actors
Spanish male stage actors
20th-century Spanish male actors
21st-century Spanish male actors
Deaths from cancer in Spain